Globle may refer to:
Globle (game), a Worldle-like country-identification game
A common misspelling of Global
Globle, a company founded by Simon Tian